Prince Michał Kazimierz Radziwiłł (13 June 1702 – 15 May 1762) was a Polish–Lithuanian noble. A member of the aristocratic Radziwiłł family, he was frequently referred to by his idiolect Rybeńko (Рыбанька), to distinguish him from the other Michał Kazimierz Radziwiłł. Ordynat of Niasviž and Olyka, owner of Biržai, Dubingiai, Slutsk, Kopyła and Shumsk.

He was a koniuszy of Lithuania since 1728, Court Marshal of Lithuania since 1734, Field Hetman of Lithuania and castellan of Trakai (Troki) since 1737, castellan of Vilnius since 1742, voivode of Vilnius and Grand Hetman of Lithuania since 1744. Like his father, he was the starost of a number of towns, including Przemyśl, Bratslav, Kamianets-Podilskyi, Człuchów, Krzyczów, Ovruch, Nowy Targ, Parczew, Osiek and Kaunas.

On 23 April 1725 in Bilokrynytsia (pol. Biala Krynica) he married Urszula Franciszka Wiśniowiecka. Later married Anna Luiza Mycielska on 2 January 1754 in Lviv. Awarded with the Order of the White Eagle in August 1727.

The treatment of his medical problems included 56 bleedings, 30 applications of leeches, and 13 cuppings. These treatments have been described as illustrative demonstrations of medical interventions available to the wealthy at the time.

His former lover was Maria Karolina Sobieska, grand daughter of John III Sobieski.

References

1702 births
1762 deaths
People from Volyn Oblast
Michal Kazimierz Rybenko Radziwill
Field Hetmans of the Grand Duchy of Lithuania
Great Hetmans of the Grand Duchy of Lithuania
Court Marshals of the Grand Duchy of Lithuania
Voivode of Vilnius
Voivodes of Trakai